Endicott is a surname, and may refer to:

In Christianity:

 James Endicott (church leader) (1865–1954), Canadian church leader and missionary
 James Gareth Endicott (1898–1993), Canadian minister, Christian missionary and socialist

In military:

 John Endicott (c. 1588–1665), colonial magistrate, soldier and governor of the Massachusetts Bay Colony

In politics:

 William Crowninshield Endicott (1826–1900), American politician

In sports

 Shane Endicott (born 1981), former Pittsburgh Penguins draft pick, professional ice hockey player

In other fields:

 Marina Endicott (born 1958), Canadian novelist
 Sam Endicott (born 1974), the lead singer for the New York-based band The Bravery
 Timothy Endicott, Canadian legal scholar; former Dean of the Oxford Faculty of Law

fr:Endicott